Zoop was an award-winning Dutch youth-oriented TV series about eight young adults working in the Ouwehands Dierenpark zoo in Rhenen. The series was sold to Brazil, France, India and Sweden.

The series has had three seasons since 2004, all on the Dutch Nickelodeon channel. The series also spawned three spinoff films. Episodes continued to be broadcast up until 2014.

Cast

Movies
The spinoff movies followed the characters to countries where they continued their education in zoology.

 Zoop in Africa (2005)
 Zoop in India (2006)
 Zoop in South America (2007)

Awards
 "Gouden Stuiver" (Golden Nickel), an award for best Dutch youth program.
 "Nickelodeon Kid's Choice Award", an award for the best TV series.
 "Kinderkast Televisieprijs", an award for the best youth TV series.

Fan days
Zoop "fan days" were organised, where cast members would sign autographs. An average of 11,000 people showed up at each event. After several public appearances almost got out of hand (because the actors were overwhelmed by hundreds of fans), Nijenshuis announced in 2006 that the security details provided to the actors would be enlarged.

External links

 

Dutch children's television series
Dutch television soap operas
2000s Dutch television series
2004 Dutch television series debuts
2007 Dutch television series endings
Rhenen
Television shows adapted into films